Barh Super Thermal Power Station or NTPC Barh is located in Barh in the Indian state of Bihar. The project has been named a mega power project, and is owned by Indian energy company National Thermal Power Corporation.

The project has been contested as it is nearby Himalayan Range and needs stricter anti-pollution controls.

The 1,320 MW (2 x 660 MW) Barh Stage-2 built by BHEL is operational while 1,980 MW (3 x 660 MW) Barh Stage-1 is being built by  Russian firm Technopromexport (TPE).

Bihar's share is 1183 MW from NTPC Barh (26% from stage 1 and 50% from stage 2).

The then PM, Atal Bihari Vajpayee, had laid the foundation stone of the main plant of stage-1 of NTPC Barh on March 6, 1999. The formal inauguration of its site office and laying of the foundation stone of the training centre at the plant site was done in September 2003.

Project cost
The plant is to produce 3,300 MW of power at a cost of over Rs 26,000 crore.
The total approved cost of stage-1 (660 MW x 3) has Rs 8,692.97 crore. The total approved cost of stage-2 (unit 1) plant is Rs 7,688.12 crore.

Capacity
Unit-1 of stage-2 commissioned in November 2013. Unit-2 of stage-2 commissioned in March 2015. The first unit (of stage-I) of NTPC Barh is expected to start generation from December 2019 instead of the scheduled August 2020, while the second and third units of stage-I will be made operational in December 2020 and August 2021, respectively.

Boiler balance work of Stage-I
The boiler balance work of Stage-I (3 x 660 MW)(BSTPP)
was allotted to Doosan Power Systems India Ltd, (Korea) Company in January 2016. The work is under contract with Power Mech Projects Ltd.

Flue gas desulphurization addition
As per MOEF guidelines of Dec-2015 NTPC decided to add FGD units to all units to limit SOX emissions. BHEL was awarded the contract to supply FGD units.

References

External links
 NTPC Barh website
 BSTPP Video

Coal-fired power stations in Bihar
Patna district
2013 establishments in Bihar
Energy infrastructure completed in 2013